The 17th Goya Awards took place at the Palacio Municipal de Congresos in Madrid, Spain on 1 February 2003.

Mondays in the Sun won the award for Best Film.

Winners and nominees

Major award nominees

Other award nominees

Honorary Goya
 Manuel Alexandre

References

17
2002 film awards
2002 in Spanish cinema
2003 in Madrid